Catfish Brasil is a Brazilian reality-based documentary television series airing on MTV about the truths and lies of online dating. The series is based on the American television series Catfish and is co-hosted by Ciro Sales and Ricardo Gadelha. It premiered on August 31, 2016.

Series overview

References

External links

Official website

Brazilian reality television series
2016 Brazilian television series debuts
2018 Brazilian television series endings
MTV original programming
Television shows set in Brazil